Carrington Byndom (born July 7, 1992) is a former American football cornerback. He played college football at Texas. He was signed by the Panthers as an undrafted free agent in May 2014.

Professional career

Carolina Panthers
On May 16, 2014, Byndom was signed as an undrafted free agent by the Carolina Panthers. On August 30, 2014, he was waived by the Panthers. On September 1, 2014, he was signed to the Panthers' practice squad. On September 5, 2015, he was released by the Panthers. On September 7, 2015, Byndom was signed to the Panthers' practice squad. On September 9, 2015, he was released by the Panthers.

Arizona Cardinals
The Arizona Cardinals signed Byndom to their practice squad on October 21, 2015. On January 26, 2016, Byndom signed a futures contract with the Arizona Cardinals. On July 19, 2016, the Cardinals waived Byndom.

Baltimore Ravens
On August 17, 2016, Byndom signed with the Ravens. On September 3, 2016, he was placed on injured reserve. On September 8, 2016, he was released from the Ravens' injured reserve with an injury settlement.

References

External links
Carolina Panthers bio
Texas Longhorns bio

1992 births
Living people
People from Lufkin, Texas
Players of American football from Texas
American football cornerbacks
Texas Longhorns football players
Carolina Panthers players
Baltimore Ravens players